Caiman is a genus of caimans within the alligatorid subfamily Caimaninae. They inhabit Central and South America. They are relatively small sized crocodilians, with all species reaching lengths of only a couple of meters and weighing  on average.

Characteristics
Caimans are similar to alligators in morphology but differ in having bony plates, known as osteoderms, buried in the skin on the underside. The broad-snouted and spectacled caimans are characterised by having a bony ridge across the bridge of the nose just below the eyes.

Distribution and habitat
This genus is present in Central and South America. It is usually found in freshwater, but also visits the brackish water of estuaries on occasion. It has varying habitats including wetlands and slow-moving rivers and streams. The yacare caiman (Caiman yacare) occurs in the central part of southern South America, particularly in the Pantanal region, the largest tropical wetland area in the world, which is flooded seasonally by the Paraguay River. The broad-snouted caiman (Caiman latirostris) occurs in central and eastern South America, its range including southeastern Brazil, Bolivia, Paraguay, Uruguay and northern Argentina, within the drainage systems of the Paraná, Paraguay, Uruguay and São Francisco Rivers.

Behaviour
Caimans spend much of their time basking on mudflats or in sunlit, muddy jungle streams. In the dry season, large numbers may accumulate in pools as the surrounding land dries up. They can move on land with some rapidity, hiss when disturbed, and young individuals can inflate themselves before opening their jaws aggressively. Caimans do not usually attack humans but domestic livestock are at risk. They seize their prey and drag it underwater to drown it. They may observe a potential prey, swim away, submerge and return to attack the floating bird or drinking mammal from underwater. Juvenile caimans feed on crustaceans and molluscs while larger animals feed on amphibians, fish, birds, mammals and reptiles.

A caiman nest is a mound of vegetation and mud consolidated by the female by lying on it. She then digs a hole in it and buries a few dozen eggs in it. When these hatch, the juveniles use their egg teeth to break their way out. They look like miniature versions of their parents but have relatively shorter snouts and larger eyes.

Taxonomy

Extant species

Fossil species 
Species known only from fossil remains:
 †Caiman australis  - Ituzaingó Formation, Argentina
 †Caiman brevirostris  - Solimões Formation, Brazil and Urumaco Formation, Venezuela
 †Caiman gasparinae  - Ituzaingó Formation, Argentina
 †Caiman niteroiensis  - Solimões Formation, Brazil
 †Caiman paranensis  - Ituzaingó Formation, Argentina
 †Caiman praecursor  - Ituzaingó Formation, Argentina
 †Caiman venezuelensis  - Mesa Formation, Venezuela
 †Caiman wannlangstoni  - Honda Group, Colombia, Pebas Formation, Peru and Urumaco Formation, Venezuela

References

Alligatoridae
Reptiles described in 1825
Taxa named by Johann Baptist von Spix
Reptile genera